Mamadou is a common given name in West Africa among predominantly Muslim ethnic groups such as the Mandé and Wolof people. It is a variant of the Arabic name Muhammad.

Academics
Mamadou Diouf (historian), Senegalese professor of West African history at Columbia University

Arts and music
MAMADOU, Senegalese band based in the United States
Mamadou Diabaté, Malian kora player
Mamadou Diop (musician), Senegalese rhythm guitarist and band leader
Mamadou Konte, Senegalese music producer

Government
Mamadou (mansa), ruler of the Mali Empire
Mamadou Blaise Sangaré, Malian politician, president of the Social Democratic Convention
Mamadou Boye Bah, Guinean economist and politician
Mamadou Kamara Dékamo, Congo-Brazzaville politician and diplomat
Mamadou Dembelé, Malian politician
Mamadou Dia, Senegalese politician, former prime minister
Mamadou Diop (politician), Senegalese politician, former mayor of Dakar
Mamadou Koulibaly, Ivorian politician
Mamadou Lamine Loum, Senegalese politician, former prime minister
Mamadou Lamine Traoré, Malian politician
Mamadou Maidah, Nigerien politician and diplomat
Mamadou Ouédraogo, French Upper Volta (present-day Burkina Faso) politician
Mamadou Samba Barry, Burkina Faso politician, secretary of the New Social Democracy party
Mamadou Seck (politician), Senegalese politician, president of the National Assembly of Senegal
Mamadou Sylla (politician), Guinean judge and businessman
Mamadou Tandja, Nigerien politician, former president

Sports
Mamadou Alimou Diallo, Guinean footballer
Mamadou Bagayoko, Malian footballer
Mamadou Bagayoko (footballer, born 1989), Ivorian footballer
Mamadou Bah, Guinean footballer
Mamadou Baldé, Senegalese footballer
Mamadou Camara, French footballer
Mamadou Danso, Gambian footballer
Mamadou Dansoko, Ivorian footballer
Mamadou Chérif Dia, Malian long and triple jumper
Mamadou Diabang, Senegalese footballer
Mamadou Diakité, Malian footballer
Mamadou Diallo (disambiguation), multiple people
Mamadou Diarra, Malian basketball player
Mamadou Diop (basketball, born 1955), Senegalese basketball player at the 1980 Summer Olympics
Mamadou Djikine, Malian footballer
Mamadou Doumbia, Ivorian footballer
Mamadou Gueye (jumper), Senegalese long and triple jumper
Mamadou Gueye (sprinter), Senegalese 400 metres sprinter
Mamadou N'Diaye (disambiguation), multiple people
Mamadou Niang, Senegalese footballer
Mamadou Sakho, French footballer of Senegalese descent
Mamadou Samassa (footballer, born 1986), French-born Malian international footballer also of Senegalese descent
Mamadou Samassa (footballer, born 1990), French-born Malian international footballer
Mamadou Seck, Senegalese footballer
Mamadou Tall, Burkina Faso footballer
Mamadou Wague, French footballer
Mamadou Zaré, Ivorian football manager
Mamadou Zongo, Burkina Faso footballer

See also
 
 Moussa
 Muhammad (name)

References

Masculine given names